Bruderkrieg (German for "brother war") may refer to:

 Saxon Brother War, 1446–1451
 Austro-Prussian War, 1866

See also 
 Brothers War (disambiguation)
 Fratricide